Casey Clark (born July 13, 1990) is an American rugby league footballer for the Philadelphia Fight in the USA Rugby League and previously with the Jacksonville Axemen and the Helensburgh Tigers in Australia. He has also played rugby union with the Missoula Maggots and spent some time in New Zealand and with the USA Rugby 7s. In 2013 he won the national title with Philadelphia Fight, beating his past team Jacksonville Axemen in the final, and was named Most Valuable Player. He is a USA international, and in 2015 helped the team qualify for the 2017 Rugby League World Cup.

References 

American rugby league players
American rugby union players
Philadelphia Fight players
Jacksonville Axemen players
United States national rugby league team players
Living people
1990 births
Sportspeople from Olympia, Washington
Rugby league second-rows